Johann Sabath (born 4 June 1939) is a retired German football defender.

Career

Statistics

References

External links
 

1939 births
Living people
German footballers
MSV Duisburg players
VfL Bochum players
1. FC Bocholt players
Bundesliga players
Association football defenders